Sleepthief is an American electronic music recording project formed by producer and composer Justin Elswick. Elswick began writing music for the album ten years prior to its release. The album was mixed, mastered, co-produced, and co-arranged by Israel Curtis. Sleepthief's first album, The Dawnseeker, was released in 2006.

Sleepthief is most often compared to musical groups such as Delerium (in its output from the mid-1990s onward) and Balligomingo, which produce emotive, melodic, synthesized music with what is often described as new-age-influenced ethnic characteristics from other cultures. Also similar to these groups is Sleepthief's use of pop music-based song structures with performances by female singers. Eleven vocalists contribute to The Dawnseeker, many of whom are established recording artists, and some having worked with the aforementioned groups previously. All of Sleepthief's cover album art was drawn by his long-time collaborator Brian Son.

Biography
Born in Southern California, Elswick served as a missionary for the Church of Jesus Christ of Latter-day Saints in Texas and received a B.A. degree in History from Brigham Young University. Throughout this period, he became a self-taught musician. Justin also studied in Ireland, graduating with a master's degree in philosophy at Trinity College, Dublin followed by a Juris Doctor degree at J. Reuben Clark Law School. He is currently a practicing attorney in Provo, Utah.

In addition, Elswick wrote for Musical Discoveries, a music website dedicated to female vocalists, as an associate editor.

History of Sleepthief
Elswick began working on songs with Curtis around 2003. Russell Elliot, editor-in-chief of Musical Discoveries, put Elswick in contact with singer Jody Quine in December 2003. Quine became the first singer to join with the project, recording three songs and being filmed for a music video by 2005. Vic Levak, who worked with Balligomingo along with Quine, also worked with the group.

The Dawnseeker

All songs written by Elswick and the vocalist featured except where otherwise noted.

Singles
The lead single, "Eurydice", was released as a digital download as well as a limited-edition CD single. The track listing for the single is as follows:

The new "Eurydice" mix was released on August 12, 2012 and is credited to DjMikelD (who did the Angels on Water Mix for the song).

The follow-up single, "The Chauffeur", is a cover of the Duran Duran song and was released in the same formats. 11 different versions of the song appear on the single, along with a cover of the Scorpions song "Send Me an Angel", with Kristy Thirsk on vocals. A limited edition CD single featuring the music video for "The Chauffeur" was released by Neurodisc soon afterwards.

The track list for the single is as follows:

Music videos were filmed for "Tenuous", "Eurydice", and "The Chauffeur".

Labyrinthine Heart

Singles
The lead single for the Labyrinthine Heart, "World Gone Crazy", features the vocals of Coury Palermo and was released as a digital download EP on June 30, 2009. It includes the original version as well as several remixed versions and a music video.

In December 2009, a new version of the World Gone Crazy EP was released.

The track "Skimming Stones", performed with Kirsty Hawkshaw, is a reprised version that was originally released on a compilation album featuring various female vocalists called Sirenes: The Beauty of the Female Voice. A music video was also produced for this track.

The next single was "Reason Why", a duet performed by Coury Palermo & Zoë Johnston. A music video has been shot for the track as well, set in the Provo Tabernacle, which was destroyed by a fire in December 2010. Along with several remixes, a new song titled "Asunder" was released. It is performed with the neoclassical/Celtic duo Mirabilis.

The track list is as follows:

Mortal Longing

Sleepthief's third full-length album, Mortal Longing, was released on August 17, 2018. A crowd-funding campaign to raise $40,000 for the third album was launched on June 28, 2013, which raised around $10,000. Kirsty Hawkshaw, Caroline Lavelle, Coury Palermo, Carla Werner, Jody Quine, Kristy Thirsk, Sonja Drakulich, Roberta Harrison, Andrea Gerak, Phildel, Marcella Detroit and Sandra Jill Alikas-St. Thomas were potential singers for the album.

All songs written by Curtis, Elswick and the vocalist featured except where otherwise noted.

Singles

"Mortal Longing" was released on June 4, 2012, while the digital single and remixes from Psychosomatic, Blue Stone, and DjMikeID were released on June 11, 2012. A music video was released with the single. It was shot in the Goblin Valley State Park in Utah and features Jody Quine and Justin Curtis, Elswick himself in what can be defined a metaphor of the search for love. "a search that not always is happy". Jody Quine had a short insight on the song concept:

Another new single, "This Means War", was recorded in June 2013 with Joanna Stevens and released as an EP on November 12, 2013, along with a science fiction-themed music video. The track list is as follows:

The music video for "Dust & Cloud" was released on July 21, 2014, and the single itself was released on July 28, 2014. The track list is as follows:

The music video for "The Sandshaper" was released on August 17, 2018.

Other projects
After releasing Labyrinthine Heart, Elswick released two new tracks included in the compilation Beauty 2 - Music That Touches The Soul, which was released on October 25, 2010. The first track, "Another Day", was sung by Kyoko Baertsoen and is a cover of the original song by This Mortal Coil. The second track, "Empyrean", was sung by Suzanne Perry and was performed with the glossolalia technique.

Sleepthief's website site was launched on June 11. He is also working on a remix and a song for Nicola Hitchcock's solo album. Another cover version of "Send Me an Angel" has been released in December 2012, featuring strings by Caroline Lavelle. Both of Sleepthief's albums have been available on iTunes since April 12, 2013.

He is currently busy with a side project with Caroline Lavelle and Israel Curtis called "Spythriller", and the first video and related single, a cover of Nightwish's "Nemo", was released on November 15, 2011 with remixes of the song from Jamie Myerson and Treatise. Two more tracks for the album, "Cold War Kisses" and "Aftermath", can be found on the Spythriller official website and official YouTube channel. The next single will be "Asleep in Metropolis", and will feature a video shot by Hugh Marsh.

Curtis is also working with Roberta Carter-Harrison on her solo album and with Carla Werner on her own solo dance album.

Sleepthief also releases spiritual and Christmas songs on his SoundCloud page. The songs, listed by date released, are:

 "O Come, O Come Emmanuel" (feat. Kristy Hawkshaw, Coury Palermo and Zoë Johnston)
 "Veni Redemptor, Solamen Gentium" (feat. Jana Thompson Ellsworth)
 "Snow" (feat. Zoë Johnston)
 "Tollite Hostias" (feat. Lauralyn Curtis)
 "Ubi Caritas [Altius Mix]" (feat. Kristy Thirsk)
 "What Child Is This?" (feat. Jody Quine)
 "Deus Meus" (feat. Amanda Elswick)

These songs, excluding "Ubi Caritas [Altius Mix]", form the Christmas album Echoes of Winter, which was released on SoundCloud on November 30, 2016.

Remixes 
 Blue Stone – "Bridges" (Sleepthief Remix)
 Balligomingo – "Invitation" (Sleepthief Remix)
 Coury Palermo – "Hush" (Sleepthief Remix)
 Delerium – "Chrysalis Heart" (Sleepthief Remix)
 Eireann Wax – "Here Tonight" (Sleepthief Remix)
 Mirabilis – "Sanctuary of Mind" (Sleepthief Remix)
 Vanessa Daou – "Black & White" (Sleepthief's L'Eroica Mix)

Notes and references

External links
 Official Site

American electronic musicians
Electronic music groups from Utah
Musical groups established in 2006
2006 establishments in Utah